Ignition Management is a London-based music management company run by partners Marcus Russell & Alec McKinlay.

Ignition Management was formed in late 1983 by Welshman Marcus Russell, who at the time managed London based band Latin Quarter, who became established in Scandinavia & West Germany before going on to score a UK Hit with the song Radio Africa in 1986.

Ignition went on to manage Cambridge band The Bible, before expanding to take on Johnny Marr, The The and Electronic as the 90's approached. It was at this time that previous associate Alec Mckinlay returned from his native New Zealand to London to rejoin Ignition, and to later become a partner with Russell.

In May 1993 Ignition took on what was to become their most well known and successful client: Oasis.

The band fronted by the Gallagher brothers Noel & Liam, went on to sell over 70 million albums worldwide, and become one of the world biggest touring bands, playing to a total of 1.1 million on what turned out to be their final UK Tour in 2008/9.

Between 2000–2010 Ignition also managed North American clients Mercury Rev and Black Mountain, as well as New Zealand based Neil Finn and his band Crowded House.

Subsequent to Oasis splitting in 2009, Ignition has continued to manage Noel Gallagher, overseeing the launch of his highly successful 10 year solo career as Noel Gallagher's High Flying Birds. Since the middle of the last decade, Ignition's roster has grown further, taking on highly successful international touring artists Catfish and the Bottlemen, and Scottish singer/songwriter Amy McDonald. They have also expanded to establish a North American arm of Ignition management based in Los Angeles, whose clients include Neon Trees and Wilderado.

McKinlay and Russell also own Ignition Records, which has been highly active with releases over the last decade or so.

In November 2016, Ignition co-founders invested in ticket resale platform Twickets.

References

External links 
 

Music companies of the United Kingdom
English music managers
Oasis (band)